The Alta Vista–Camp Fornance–Newman Park Historic District, is a predominantly residential historic district in northwestern Columbia, South Carolina. It encompasses much of the neighborhood of Earlewood, and is formed out of three separate subdivisions that were developed as streetcar suburbs in the early 20th century. It is roughly bounded on the east and south by the tracks of the Seaboard Air Line, the north by Earlewood Park and Lakewood Avenue, and the northwest by Darlington Avenue.

The district was added to the National Register of Historic Places in 2015.

See also
National Register of Historic Places listings in Columbia, South Carolina

References

Historic districts on the National Register of Historic Places in South Carolina
National Register of Historic Places in Columbia, South Carolina